Simen Mustrøens besynderlige oplevelser (Simen Mustrøen's Strange Adventures) is a Norwegian film from 1926 based on a story by Johan Falkberget. The film was directed by Harry Ivarson with cinematography by Erling Knudsen and Johannes Bentzen. It is now considered lost.

Plot
The film tells the story of a woodcarver named Simen, who is cheated by a wealthy farmer out of some silver that he has inherited. Simen starts a rumor about his own death, and he starts acting like a ghost. After frightening the wealthy farmer and the sexton, who has begun wooing Simen's wife, the wealthy farmer's fraud is discovered, and the bailiff arrests him. Simen is "resurrected" from the dead and is recognized for his artwork.

Cast

 Martin Gisti as Simen Mustrøen 
 Didi Holtermann as Bertille, Simen's wife 
 Sophus Dahl as Per Pikajord 
 Haakon Hjelde as Helge Hjort, the district judge 
 Kolbjørn Skjefstad as Lars Kaldbækken, the sexton
 Arne Svendsen as Theodor, the priest
 Ellen Astrup as Edith, the priest's daughter 
 Arthur Barking as the bailiff 
 Sæbjørn Buttedahl as Ola, a farm boy 
 Marit Haugan as Anne, a servant girl 
 Oscar Magnussen as a farm boy 
 Helga Rydland

References

External links

Simen Mustrøens besynderlige oplevelser at the National Library of Norway

1926 films
Norwegian silent feature films
Norwegian black-and-white films
Films directed by Harry Ivarson
Norwegian comedy films
Norwegian thriller films
1926 drama films
Silent comedy films
Silent thriller films